Alexander Yuryevich Stetsurenko (born April 20, 1983) is a Russian welterweight kickboxer. He is a three time Tatneft Cup tournament winner, Kunlun Fight tournament winner and W5 World champion.

Combat Press has ranked him in the welterweight top ten between September 2014 and September 2015, March and September 2017, as well as between May 2018 and June 2019.

Kickboxing career
Stetsurenko is well known for having trilogy with best Russian kickboxer, Artem Levin. It all started in March 2008 for the WMC intercontinental title, where he was defeated by unanimous decision in five rounds. Later, on Tatneft Cup 2009 Final he became one of the very few to defeat Levin, dropping him two times in round 4 with corner retirement after that round and Stetsurenko became Tatneft Arena Cup champion for second time. Third fight was on November 19, 2010, on Battle of Champions V event with Levin taking second victory. Later Levin described Stetsurenko as the hardest opponent he has ever had to face and says fighting him is “physically and mentally exhausting.”

On November 26, 2011, he participated in a Forward Challenge – European Grand Prix along with seven kickboxing champions, defeating Nahid Asadov and Ernestas Dapkus before facing Mareks Lavrinovics in the final. Mareks was more active in the ring and successfully worked with the legs, but one kick ended in Stetsurenko's knee and fight was stopped because of injury, making Stetsurenko tournament champion. They had a rematch the next year with the same epilogue.

He fought once again for the Tatneft Arena World Cup on October 20, 2012, rematching Hicham El Gaoui, of which he lost in Tatneft 2011 final in a super fight. This was another close fight, Hicham probably won first three rounds, but without knockdown so according to Tatneft's rules there was an extra round where Stetsurenko got the razor thin decision victory.

On February 6, 2015, Stetsurenko was part of a one-night, four-man welterweight tournament at Glory 19 to determine who would get the next title shot.  In the semifinals, he faced Nieky Holzken and lost via unanimous decision.

On April 23, 2016, Stetsurenko took over Errol Koning of the Netherlands during W5 Grand Prix KITEK which was held in Moscow, finalizing a trilogy with Dutch opponent. Previous two bouts were chalked up in the favour of each of the fighters. In this Moscow title bout Stetsurenko won W5 World champion belt which after the fight he gave as a gift to a kid with restricted abilities who said that he is dreaming become a champion too. He defended the title during W5 Grand Prix KITEK XXXIX, against Vladimir Idranyi, by unanimous decision.

After winning the title, Stetsurenko participated in the KLF 80 kg tournament, held during Kunlun Fight 50. In the quarterfinals, he defeated Bo Fufan by decision. In the semifinals, he defeated Darryl Sichtman by unanimous decision. Alexander faced Dmitry Valent in the finals, and won by split decision.

Titles
 2016 Kunlun Fight 2016 (-80 kg) Tournament Champion.
 2016 W5 World Champion (-81 kg)
 2012 Tatneft Arena World Cup 2012 Champion (-80 kg)
 2011 Forward Challenge– European Grand Prix Winner
 2010 Tatneft Arena World Cup 2010 Champion (-80 kg)
 2010 W5 World Champion (-81 kg)
 2009 Tatneft Arena World Cup 2009 Champion (-80 kg)
 2009 WBKF European Champion (-76 kg/167 lb)
 2008 Tatneft Arena World Cup 2008 Champion (-80 kg)
 3x Russian WAKO Kickboxing Champion
 Russian WAKO K-1 Champion

Mixed martial arts record

|-
|Win
|align=center|1–0
|Timur Nikulin
|KO (punches)
|AMC Fight Nights 108
|
|align=center|2
|align=center|2:32
|Krasnogorsk, Russia
|

Professional kickboxing record

|-  style="background:#cfc;"
| 2022-11-18 || Win||align=left| Adilzhan Santibekov || REN TV Fight Club || Moscow, Russia || KO (Spinning back kick to the liver) || 2 || 1:30
|-  style="background:#fbb;"
| 2022-04 -16 || Loss||align=left| Maxim Sulgin || Fair Fight 16 || Yekaterinburg, Russia|| Decision (Unanimous) || 5 || 3:00
|-
! style=background:white colspan=9 |
|-  style="background:#fbb;"
| 2021-12-13 || Loss||align=left| Jonatan Oliveira || Tatneft Cup, -80kg Final || Russia|| Ext.R Decision  || 4 || 3:00
|-
! style=background:white colspan=9 |
|-  style="background:#cfc;"
| 2021-12-13 || Win ||align=left| Vadim Apsit || Tatneft Cup, -80kg Semi Finals || Russia|| Ext.R Decision  || 4 || 3:00
|-  style="background:#cfc;"
| 2021-09-28 || Win ||align=left| Enis Yunusoğlu || Tatneft Cup, -80kg Quarter Finals || Russia|| Ext.R Decision  || 4 || 3:00
|-  style="background:#cfc;"
| 2019-06-29 || Win ||align=left| Liu Dacheng || Wu Lin Feng 2019: WLF -67kg World Cup 2019-2020 1st Group Stage || Zhengzhou, China|| Decision  || 3 || 3:00
|-  style="background:#cfc;"
| 2018-11-03 || Win ||align=left| Fu Gaofeng || Wu Lin Feng 2018: WLF -67kg World Cup 2018-2019 5th Round || China || TKO (4 Knockdowns) || 3 || 0:50
|-  style="background:#cfc;"
| 2018-08-05 || Win ||align=left| Pavel Provashinskiy ||ACB KB-17 || Russia || Decision (Unanimous) || 3 || 3:00
|-  style="background:#cfc;"
| 2018-06-30 || Win ||align=left| Liu Dacheng || Wu Lin Feng 2018: China vs Netherlands & Russia || Shenyang, China || Decision (Unanimous) || 3 || 3:00
|-  style="background:#cfc;"
| 2018-04-20 || Win ||align=left| Jonatan Oliveira || ACB KB 15: Grand Prix Kitek || Moscow, Russia || Decision (Unanimous) || 3 || 3:00
|- style="background:#fbb;"
| 2017-11-24|| Loss ||align=left| Caibao Zhang  || -85 kg KFWC savate pro  || France || DQ (Illegal Knee) || 1 ||
|-  style="background:#cfc;"
| 2017-07-15 || Win ||align=left| Zakaria Baitar  || |ACB KB 10: Russia vs. China || Russia || TKO (Foot Injury) || 2 || 
|- style="background:#fbb;"
| 2017-03-25 || Loss ||align=left| Cyril Benzaquen || |ACB KB 9: Showdown in Paris || Paris, France || Decision (Unanimous) || 3 || 3:00
|-  style="background:#cfc;"
| 2017-02-18 || Win ||align=left| Vladimir Idranyi || W5 Grand Prix KITEK XXXIX || Moscow, Russia || Decision (Unanimous) || 5 || 3:00
|-
! style=background:white colspan=9 |
|-  style="background:#cfc;"
| 2016-12-10 || Win ||align=left| Dmitry Valent || Kunlun Fight 55 – 80 kg Tournament, Final || China || Decision (Split) || 3 || 3:00
|-
! style=background:white colspan=9 |
|-  style="background:#cfc;"
| 2016-12-10 || Win ||align=left| Darryl Sichtman || Kunlun Fight 55 – 80 kg Tournament, Semi Finals || China || Decision (Unanimous) || 3 || 3:00
|-  style="background:#cfc;"
| 2016-08-20 || Win ||align=left| Bo Fufan || Kunlun Fight 50 – 80 kg Tournament, Quarter Finals || Jinan, China || Decision || 3 || 3:00
|- style="background:#cfc;"
| 2016-07-15 || Win ||align=left| Wang Zhiguo || Wu Lin Feng 2016 - Russia vs China || Zhengzhou, China || KO || 1 || 
|- style="background:#cfc;"
| 2016-06-05 || Win ||align=left| Alka Matewa || |ACB KB 6: Battle in Brussels || Merchtem, Belgium || Decision || 3 || 3:00
|- style="background:#cfc;"
| 2016-04-24 || Win ||align=left| Errol Koning || W5 Grand Prix KITEK XXXII || Moscow, Russia || TKO || 3 || 
|-
! style=background:white colspan=9 |
|- style="background:#cfc;"
| 2016-03-20 || Win ||align=left| Ruslan Kostin || Russian Challenge || Moscow, Russia || TKO || 3 || 
|- style="background:#fbb;"
|2015-11-13 || Loss ||align=left| Zakaria Baitar || ACB KB 4: Grand Prix Final|| Perm, Russia || TKO || 1 || 1:59 
|- style="background:#fbb;"
|2015-07-19 || Loss ||align=left| Bai Jinbin || Kunlun Fight 28 – 80 kg Tournament, Quarter Finals || Nanjing, China || Decision (split) || 3 || 3:00
|- style="background:#fbb;"
| 2015-02-06 || Loss  ||align=left| Nieky Holzken || Glory 19: Virginia - Welterweight Contender Tournament, semifinals || Hampton, Virginia, USA || Decision (unanimous) || 3 || 3:00
|- style="background:#fbb;"
| 2014-12-13 || Loss ||align=left| Karim Ghajji || Victory|| Paris, France || Decision (Unanimous) || 3 || 3:00
|- style="background:#cfc;"
| 2014-11-16 || Win ||align=left| Nuerla || Kunlun Fight 13 || Hohhot, China || Decision (unanimous) || 3 ||  3:00
|- style="background:#cfc;"
| 2014-09-12 || Win ||align=left| Sergey Parchinsky || King of the Hill (81 kg)|| Moscow, Russia || Decision (Unanimous) || 3 || 3:00
|- style="background:#fbb;"
| 2014-03-01 || Loss ||align=left| Paul Daley ||  Siam Warriors: Revolution on Leeside || Cork, Ireland || TKO (left cross) || 1 || 0:40 
|- style="background:#cfc;"
| 2013-12-21 || Win ||align=left| Karim Ghajji || Glory 13: Tokyo - Welterweight Tournament, Reserve Match|| Tokyo, Japan || Decision (Unanimous) || 3 || 3:00
|- style="background:#fbb;"
| 2013-09-28 || Loss ||align=left| Karapet Karapetyan || Glory 10: Los Angeles|| Ontario, California, USA || Decision (unanimous) || 3 || 3:00 
|- style="background:#cfc;"
| 2013-06-16 || Win ||align=left| Zaurs Dzavadovs || Tech-KREP FC - battle of Stars 2 (77 kg)|| Kaspiysk, Russia || TKO || 2 || 
|- style="background:#fbb;"
| 2013-03-23 || Loss ||align=left| Errol Koning || R-1 - Fights Time (81 kg)|| Rostov-on-Don, Russia  || Decision (Split) || 3 || 2:00
|- style="background:#cfc;"
| 2012-12-16 || Win ||align=left| Karapet Karapetyan || Fight Nights: Battle of Moscow 9 (80 kg)|| Moscow, Russia || Decision (majority) || 3 || 3:00 
|- style="background:#cfc;"
| 2012-10-20 || Win ||align=left| Hicham El Gaoui || Tatneft Arena World Cup 2012 final (80 kg) || Kazan, Russia || Decision (Unanimous) || 4 || 3:00
|-
! style=background:white colspan=9 |
|- style="background:#cfc;"
| 2012-07-19 || Win ||align=left| Errol Koning|| Tatneft Cup 2012 semifinal (80 kg)|| Kazan, Russia || Decision (Unanimous) || 4 || 3:00
|- style="background:#cfc;"
| 2012-06-28 || Win ||align=left| Pavel Turuk || Dictator FC (81 kg)|| Moscow, Russia || Decision (Unanimous) || 3 || 3:00
|- style="background:#cfc;"
| 2012-06-02 || Win ||align=left| Samir Al Mansouri || Tatneft Arena World Cup 2012 2nd selection 1/4 final (80 kg) || Kazan, Russia || Decision (Unanimous) || 4 ||3:00 
|- style="background:#cfc;"
| 2012-04-14 || Win ||align=left| Mareks Lavrinovics ||Fight Nights - Faxe Forward Challenge 2 || Riga, Latvia || TKO (Injury) || 2 || 1:12
|- style="background:#cfc;"
| 2012-03-11 || Win ||align=left| Pavel Turuk || Best Fighter - Russia vs. Belarus (81 kg)|| Samara, Russia || Decision (Unanimous) || 3 ||3:00
|- style="background:#cfc;"
| 2012-02-24 || Win ||align=left| Tadas Jonkus || Tatneft Cup 2012 3rd Selection 1/8 final || Kazan, Russia || Decision|| 4 || 3:00
|- style="background:#cfc;"
| 2011-11-26 || Win ||align=left| Mareks Lavrinovics ||Forward Challenge– European Grand Prix K1 rules; Final || Riga, Latvia || TKO (Injury) || 1 || 1:15
|-
! style=background:white colspan=9 |
|- style="background:#cfc;"
| 2011-11-26 || Win ||align=left| Ernestas Dapkus ||Forward Challenge– European Grand Prix K1 rules; semifinals|| Riga, Latvia ||  ||  || 
|- style="background:#cfc;"
| 2011-11-26 || Win ||align=left| Nahid Asadov ||Forward Challenge– European Grand Prix K1 rules; quarterfinals|| Riga, Latvia ||  ||  || 
|- style="background:#fbb;"
| 2011-11-12 || Loss ||align=left| Hicham El Gaoui || Tatneft Cup 2011 Final (80 kg)|| Kazan, Russia  || Decision (Unanimous) || 3 || 3:00
|- style="background:#fbb;"
| 2011-10-20 || Loss ||align=left| Dmitry Shakuta || W5 || Krasnodar, Russia || Decision || 3 || 3:00 
|-
! style=background:white colspan=9 |
|- style="background:#fbb;"
| 2011-07-23 || Loss ||align=left| Alexander Oleinik || Tatneft Cup 2011 1/2 final (80 kg)|| Kazan, Russia || Decision (Unanimous) || 4 || 3:00 
|- style="background:#cfc;"
| 2011-04-28 || Win ||align=left| Wehaj Kingboxing|| Tatneft Cup 2011 2nd selection 1/4 final (80 kg)|| Kazan, Russia || KO || 2 || 2:07
|- style="background:#cfc;"
| 2011-04-09 || Win ||align=left| Vasily Tereshonok || W5 Grand Prix K.O. (81 kg) || Moscow, Russia || Decision (Unanimous) || 4 || 3:00 
|- style="background:#cfc;"
| 2011-03-22 || Win ||align=left| Claudio Seguel || Tatneft Arena World Cup 2010 4th selection 1/8 final (80 kg) || Kazan, Russia || KO || 2 || 1:15
|- style="background:#cfc;"
| 2011-02-26 || Win ||align=left| Alexey Kunchenko || Ice Storm 3 (81 kg) || Nefteyugansk, Russia || Decision (Unanimous) || 3 || 3:00 
|- style="background:#cfc;"
| 2011-02-12 || Win ||align=left| Vugar Kazimov || W5 League (81 kg) || Moscow, Russia || TKO || 1 || 
|- style="background:#cfc;"
| 2010-12-09 || Win ||align=left| Miran Fabjan || WFC 12: Proteini.si Showtime || Ljubljana, Slovenia || KO || 2 || 
|- style="background:#fbb;"
| 2010-11-19 || Loss ||align=left| Artem Levin || Battle of Champions V - 81 kg || Moscow, Russia || Decision (Unanimous) || 3 || 3:00
|- style="background:#cfc;"
| 2010-10-20 || Win ||align=left| Artem Vakhitov || Tatneft Cup 2010 Part 7, Final || Kazan, Russia || Ext. R. Decision (Unanimous) || 6 || 3:00 
|-
! style=background:white colspan=9 |
|- style="background:#cfc;"
| 2010-07-29 || Win ||align=left| Plianphithak Kasemsan || Tatneft Arena World Cup 2010 1/2 final (80 kg) || Kazan, Russia || KO (Knee to the Head) || 2 || 
|- style="background:#cfc;"
| 2010-07-03 || Win ||align=left| Vladimir Shulyak || Kickboxing Fights (81 kg) || Petropavlovsk-Kamchatsky, Russia || RTD || 3 || 
|- style="background:#cfc;"
| 2010-05-13 || Win ||align=left| Marcel Jager || Tatneft Arena World Cup 2010 2nd selection 1/4 final (80 kg) || Kazan, Russia || KO || 2 || 
|- style="background:#cfc;"
| 2010-05-08 || Win ||align=left| Saiseelek Nor-Seepun || Star of Victory - United Rus vs Asia (81 kg) || Mytishchi, Russia || KO || 1 || 2:40
|-
! style=background:white colspan=9 |
|- style="background:#cfc;"
| 2010-02-10 || Win ||align=left| Ernestas Dapkus || Tatneft Arena World Cup 2010 3rd selection 1/8 final (80 kg) || Kazan, Russia || Decision (Unanimous) || 3 || 3:00
|- style="background:#cfc;"
| 2009-10-23 || Win ||align=left| Artem Levin || Tatneft Arena European Cup 2009 final (80 kg) || Kazan, Russia || TKO (Corner Retirement) || 4 || 3:00
|-
! style=background:white colspan=9 |
|- style="background:#cfc;"
| 2009-09-16 || Win ||align=left| Alexander Vinogradov || Tatneft Cup 2009 Semifinal (80 kg)|| Kazan, Russia || RTD || 2 ||
|- style="background:#cfc;"
| 2009-06-25 || Win ||align=left| Kumar Zhaliev || WBKF European -76 kg/167 lb Championships, Final || Moscow, Russia || KO || 2 || 
|-
! style=background:white colspan=9 |
|- style="background:#cfc;"
| 2009-06-25 || Win ||align=left| Anatoli Hunanyan || WBKF European -76 kg/167 lb Championships, semifinals || Moscow, Russia || KO ||1 || 
|- style="background:#cfc;"
| 2009-05-26 || Win ||align=left| Alexander Shlakunov || Tatneft Cup 2009 - 2nd selection 1/4 final (80 kg)|| Kazan, Russia || KO || 2 ||
|- style="background:#cfc;"
| 2009-02-19 || Win ||align=left| Ruben van Der Giessen || Tatneft Cup 2009 4th selection for 1/8 final (80 kg)|| Kazan, Russia || KO (Right Hook) || 1 ||
|- style="background:#cfc;"
| 2008-08-29 || Win ||align=left| Alexander Vinogradov || Tatneft Cup 2008 Final || Kazan, Russia || RTD (corner retirement) || 5 ||
|-
! style=background:white colspan=9 |
|- style="background:#cfc;"
| 2008-07-31 || Win ||align=left| Alexander Romashko || 4-men Tournament for WBKF Europe Title (81 kg) || Moscow, Russia || TKO || 7 ||
|- style="background:#cfc;"
| 2008-05-29 || Win ||align=left| Alexander Kozlov || Tatneft Cup 2008 Semifinal (80 kg)|| Kazan, Russia || RTD || 2 ||
|- style="background:#cfc;"
| 2008-04-29 || Win ||align=left| Nedzhiev Emirbeckov || Tatneft Cup 2008 - 2nd selection 1/4 final (80 kg) || Kazan, Russia || RTD || 2 ||
|- style="background:#fbb;"
| 2008-03-28 || Loss ||align=left| Artem Levin || Tournament of Real Men 12 || Ekaterinburg, Russia || Decision (Unanimous) || 5 || 3:00 
|-
! style=background:white colspan=9 |
|- style="background:#cfc;"
| 2008-02-08 || Win ||align=left| Magomed Ismailov || Tatneft Cup 2008 - 4th selection 1/8 final (80 kg) || Kazan, Russia || KO || 2 ||
|- style="background:#fbb;"
| 2007-12-14 || Loss ||align=left| Shamil Abasov|| Confederation Cup, semifinals (86 kg) || Samara, Russia || Decision  || 3 ||3:00
|- style="background:#cfc;"
| 2007-12-14 || Win ||align=left| Gamzat Isalmagomedov || Confederation Cup, quarterfinals (86 kg) || Samara, Russia || Decision  || 3 ||3:00
|- style="background:#cfc;"
| 2006-11-10 || Win ||align=left| Alexei Petrov || Muaythai Night (82 kg) || St. Petersburg, Russia || TKO  || 1 (5) ||
|- style="background:#cfc;"
| 2006-06-11 || Win ||align=left| Pavel Turuk || Muaythai Night (82 kg) || St. Petersburg, Russia || Decision  || 5 ||2:00
|- style="background:#cfc;"
| 2005-05-02 || Win ||align=left| Evgeny Mishin || Oskal (75 kg) || Volgograd, Russia || Decision (Unanimous) || 3 || 3:00
|-
| colspan=9 | Legend:

Boxing record

|-
| style="text-align:center;" colspan="8"|1 Wins (0 knockouts, 1 decisions), 1 Losses, 0 Draws 
|-  style="text-align:center; background:#e3e3e3;"
|  style="border-style:none none solid solid; "|Res.
|  style="border-style:none none solid solid; "|Record
|  style="border-style:none none solid solid; "|Opponent
|  style="border-style:none none solid solid; "|Type
|  style="border-style:none none solid solid; "|Rd., Time
|  style="border-style:none none solid solid; "|Date
|  style="border-style:none none solid solid; "|Location
|  style="border-style:none none solid solid; "|Notes
|- align=center
|Win
|1-1
|align=left|  Maksym Stasiuk 
| UD || 4 
|2010-01-31 || align=left| Big Bar, Almetyevsk
|
|- align=center
|Loss
|0-1
|align=left| David Gogiya 
| UD || 6 
|2006-06-18 || align=left| Samara
|align=left|

See also
List of male kickboxers

References

External links
 
Profile at FightLife.ru
Profile at GloryWorldSeries

1983 births
Living people
Welterweight kickboxers
Glory kickboxers
Russian male kickboxers
Russian male mixed martial artists
Mixed martial artists utilizing kickboxing
Mixed martial artists utilizing boxing
Russian male boxers
Sportspeople from Saratov
Kunlun Fight kickboxing champions
Kunlun Fight kickboxers